Afshin Naghouni (is an Iranian-born, British visual artist. He is known for his controversial, larger-than-life paintings. From a critique about Naghouni’s paintings around the turn of the century: “he works in an expressive and cubist style that explores every aspect of each object in his compositions, simultaneously.”

Over the years, Naghouni's work on canvas has evolved as he has dealt with finding a balance between concept and form. As a result, his focus has shifted towards exploring colour, space, rhythm, movement, and light and dark values, leading to increasingly abstract work. Some critics have noted a darker, more sinister undercurrent in his art that challenges viewers to question what is real. For example, one critic writes that Naghouni "reminds the viewer that there is a darker, more sinister concept embedded within us," prompting reflection and introspection.

Early life and Education 
Afshin Naghouni (Ash) was born Afshin Naghouni in Ahvaz, Iran the son of Sediheh ( Mohammadzaal) and Jahangir Naghouni.

Naghouni was considered to be a child prodigy. For as long as he remembers he was holding a pen or a pencil. He started painting and drawing when he was four or five years old. As a reward, if he had good marks in school, he would go to painting classes during summer holiday.

When Naghouni was 9 years old, he went to his first oil painting class and then began emulating the paintings of Caravaggio, John Constable and others. He won a number of regional and national painting competitions between the ages of nine and twelve.

Naghouni studied art in Tehran and London, completing his postgraduate work at London Metropolitan University, in the Sir John Cass Department of Art, Media and Design.

Islamic Religious Police 
At the age of 24, Naghouni was attending a birthday party when the building was attacked by the  Islamic religious police. He managed to flee to the roof of a connecting building within the residential block, but he continued to flee as the police pursued him.

He eventually made his way to a glass patio, where he fell six or seven stories onto the concrete street, causing damage to his spinal cord and leaving him in a wheelchair. This event was the subject of a 2014 TV documentary called Out of Focus.

Years later, after Naghouni had become an internationally-known artist, he was invited to be a guest on the Radio Farda podcast, hosted by the iconic television and radio personality, Kambiz Hosseini. Hosseini asked Naghouni about the forces that drove him forward during the days, months, and initial years after his injury when he may have felt despair and hopelessness. He wanted to know how Naghouni managed to push through those difficult times.

In response, Naghouni explained that when someone hits rock bottom, they are faced with two choices: they can either choose to be miserable and hide from the world, or they can accept their situation and move forward. Naghouni stated that staying miserable and hopeless was not an option for him because it was not in his character. Hosseini noted that Naghouni never lost his creative process after the accident. (The audio and text of the interview are in Farsi, and there will be a quick link to audio tranlastion before 2 May 2023).

London 
Upon arriving in England in 1997, Naghouni was admitted to a hospital that specialized in spinal trauma care. Upon arrival, he applied for political asylum and the government provided him with healthcare and housing. He lived in a nursing home for over two years while he continued to receive medical care and build a new life for himself in a foreign country.
 
Naghouni applied for a grant from The Prince's Trust but was not awarded it. Nevertheless, he persevered and after some time was offered a loan to start his own business. Over the next five years, he continued working while also setting up his life as an artist.

After five years, Naghouni returned to university at London Metropolitan. It was during this time that he saw an image of an injured Iraqi boy, which inspired him to create a controversial painting depicting the boy's severely burned face. The painting sold immediately, marking the beginning of Naghouni's ascent in the art world.

An Abstract Sense of Life 
“Naghouni teases you in his canvas 'dolly-shot.'”  - Estelle Lovatt, Art of England, December 2011.  This phrase, taken from Lovatt's article, captures a dynamic energy and unique perspective that Naghouni brings to his work.

In the summer of 2021, Naghouni unveiled his latest series, entitled "An Abstract Sense of Life," in London. Despite the challenges posed by the  Covid-19 pandemic, the exhibition was a success, with viewers and critics alike marveling at the vibrancy and intensity of Naghouni's canvases. Lovatt, in particular, was effusive in her praise. She noted that his use of colour  was "unusually jewel-like," with a carefully curated palette of cherry-picked hues that seemed to shimmer and dance across the canvas.”

Maryam Eisler Interview 
In a 2020 interview with acclaimed artist and writer Maryam Eisler, Naghouni discussed his artistic inspirations. He cited Picasso as the historical figure who effected him the most, noting that he was drawn to Picasso's carefree spirit. When asked if there was a specific Picasso painting that came to mind, Naghouni replied that he will always be in love with Picasso's analytic period, but he also enjoys the paintings Picasso did of his lover Marie Therese around 1932–33.

Naghouni also said he was inspired by Kiefer, Cecily Brown and Caravaggio. Regarding Kiefer and his larger pieces, Naghouni is inspired by Kiefer's ability to create amazing compositions within the sheer scale of his work. "He is one of those few artists who has found the perfect balance between form and concept.”

Naghouni was amongst Eisler’s “some of the world’s greatest artists photographed” as part of her online exhibition, Confined Artists – Free Spirits: photographs from lockdown.

Activism 
As of 2011, Naghouni was the chairman of the Westminster Action Network on Disability.

Naghouni was one of 45 Iranian artists who demanded the releases of filmmakers Mohammad Nourizad and Jafar Panahi. Beyond the Ban was a collaboration between the Center for Human Rights in Iran and Susan Eley Fine Art, New York. It featured works from Naghouni and American-based Iranian artists including Shirin Neshat, Shoja Azari, and Hossein Fatemi.

Mahsa Amini Protests 
After the Iranian government killed Mahsa Amini, protests that started at Mahsa’s funeral soon erupted throughout Iran, then quickly in cities around the world. Very soon into the protests there were renewed talks of bringing down the Islamic regime; moreover, such ambitions would need leaders.

BBC News reporter Jiyar Gol was recording  from a London protest in Trafalgar Square on the 1st of October, 2022. Gol asked for Naghouni’s thoughts about the growing movement. Naghouni said,
“I think what’s going on in Iran right now is probably the biggest, most important battle for freedom, for women’s rights, for human rights anywhere in the world. It has great significance globally.”

On October 20th, 2022 Naghouni talked to Roqe Media’s Jian Ghomeshi. In a short video clip from the interview, Naghouni discusses the conceivable end of Iran’s Islamic state. Confirmations are mounting that the protesters may be undermining the government.

Naghouni explains that there have been many protests in Iran since the Iranian Revolution. Every time there’s a protest, there is talk that it could be the one that topples the Islamic regime. He never before uttered the words that he spoke publicly in the interview. He was vehement in stating that these latest protests are going to end the regime. “Nothing in Iran is going to go back to where it was a month ago … this is it, this is the beginning of the end for the Islamic Republic.” Full interview.

With global protests increasing following the death Mahsa Amini, leading Iranian artists Afshin Naghouni, Soheila Sokhanvari, Fari Bradley, Bijan Daneshmand, Maryam Eisler and Afsoon, gathered in London to give their support to the work of Human Rights Watch in Iran, as well as two additional charities currently working with the people of Iran.

In popular culture 
In 2015 London-based hip hop artist Antix released "Afshin’s Song,” a song based on the events that leading up to and following Naghouni's fall. Antix's lyrics paint a picture of Naghouni's bravery and the harsh realities of living within Iran’s Islamic regime.

See also 

 Reactions to the Mahsa Amini protests
 List of British Iranians

References

External links 

 
 
 

1969 births  
Living people 
British contemporary artists
British male painters
20th-century British male artists
21st-century British male artists
Abstract painters
Iranian painters
Mixed-media artists
Alumni of London Metropolitan University
Alumni of Sir John Cass College
English people of Iranian descent
People from Ahvaz
20th-century Iranian male artists
21st-century British painters
Human rights activists
Iranian dissidents
Iranian emigrants to England